Roman Leonidovich Usov (born 4 June 1978) is a Russian middle-distance runner. He competed in the men's 3000 metres steeplechase at the 2004 Summer Olympics.

He was banned from the sport for two years after a positive test for carphedon.

See also
List of doping cases in athletics

References

1978 births
Living people
Place of birth missing (living people)
Russian male middle-distance runners
Russian male steeplechase runners
Olympic athletes of Russia
Athletes (track and field) at the 2004 Summer Olympics
World Athletics Championships athletes for Russia
Russian Athletics Championships winners
Doping cases in athletics
Russian sportspeople in doping cases